Kybernis or Kubernis (ruled 520-480 BCE), also abbreviated KUB on his coins in Lycian, called Cyberniscus son of Sicas by Herodotus, was a dynast of Lycia, at the beginning of the time it was under the domination of the Achaemenid Empire. He is best known through his tomb, the Harpy Tomb, the decorative remains of which are now in the British Museum. According to Melanie Michailidis, though bearing a "Greek appearance", the Harpy Tomb, the Nereid Monument and the Tomb of Payava were built according main Zoroastrian criteria "by being composed of thick stone, raised on plinths off the ground, and having single windowless chambers".

Kybernis is known from Herodotus (Hdt. 7.92, 98) to have served under Xerxes I during the Persian invasion of Greece circa 480 BCE. He came with 50 ships. His men were equipped with cuirasses, felt caps with feathers, and capes made of goat-skin.

It is assumed that Kybernis disappeared at the Battle of Salamis (480 BCE), together with a large part of the Achaemenid fleet.

References

Sources
 

6th-century BC people
5th-century BC people
Rulers in the Achaemenid Empire
Military leaders of the Achaemenid Empire
People of the Greco-Persian Wars